Slapboxing (or slap-boxing) is a physical activity somewhat simulating boxing, where open handed slaps are used instead of fists. This quasi-martial art form, at an intersection between sparring and fighting, is usually performed in an ad hoc or informal manner, or when boxing protective gear is unavailable. Although a popular pastime in some circles, it is generally considered a competitive sport, but also a game or training drill.

Several rappers including Pharoahe Monch, Noreaga, Killarmy, Eminem, Ice Cube, R.A. the Rugged Man, and Brother Ali have songs in which they reminisce about slapboxing. Author Victor D. LaValle wrote the critically acclaimed Slapboxing with Jesus, a story about teenagers living in Queens, New York. The book's title is a take on a line from Ghostface Killah's Daytona 500.

In a 2004 Dateline NBC interview, singer Bobby Brown claimed to have been slapboxing with Whitney Houston when it turned violent.

References

External links
Ghetto Games: Slapboxing Essay on slapboxing etiquette

Hand games
Boxing